Paul Crarey (born 4 January 1966) also known by the nickname of "Cresta", is a former professional rugby league footballer who played in the 1980s and 1990s, and coached in the 1990s, 2000s and 2010s.

He won a Shooting Star award in 1988.

References

External links
Crarey hails Barrow table toppers
Whitehaven appoint coach Stokes
15h December 2007  Farrell Sports Newly Refurbished Shop Opened By Whitehaven Rugby league Coach Paul Crarey
(archived by web.archive.org) Coaches tackle new rugby techniques
(archived by web.archive.org) This Sporting Life - Paul Crarey
Lancaster bomber wings in for Haven
(archived by web.archive.org) Shape up or ship out
Monaghan relieves Warrington's fears over absence of injured Briers
(archived by web.archive.org) Back on the Wembley trail

1966 births
Living people
Barrow Raiders coaches
Barrow Raiders players
Carlisle RLFC players
Cumbria rugby league team coaches
English rugby league coaches
English rugby league players
Rugby league hookers
Rugby league players from Barrow-in-Furness
Whitehaven R.L.F.C. coaches
Rugby articles needing expert attention